Vale do Jequitinhonha, or simply Jequitinhonha, is one of the twelve mesoregions of the Brazilian state of Minas Gerais. It is composed of 51 municipalities spread across five microregions.

References 

Jequitinhonha